Gaëlle Mignot (born 26 February 1987) is a French female rugby union player. She represented  at the 2010 Women's Rugby World Cup, and 2014 Women's Rugby World Cup

She has played the majority of her career for Montpellier (women's rugby union) in the French women's Premier Division. In September 2017 Mignot moved to England and signed for Richmond F.C. to play for the south west London club in the newly formed Tyrrells Premier League.

Mignot captained the French squad at the 2014 Women's Six Nations Championship and scored two tries in their opening game against .

In 2019, she was on the first panel to determine the World Rugby women's-15s player-of-the-year award with Melodie Robinson, Danielle Waterman, Will Greenwood, Liza Burgess, Lynne Cantwell, Fiona Coghlan, Jillion Potter, Stephen Jones, and Karl Te Nana.

In December 2022, after current coach Thomas Darracq leaves the team, Gaëlle Mignot and David Ortiz are appointed joint head coaches of the team.

References

External links 
 

People from Périgueux
1987 births
Living people
French female rugby union players
Sportspeople from Dordogne